The day after Tunisia's independence in 1956, the newspaper Le Petit Matin took charge of establishing the classification of the top scorer in the Tunisian Ligue Professionnelle 1.

The newspaper Al Amal took over in 1961 then it was L'Action Tunisienne which formalized the classification and endowed it with a price from 1967, in parallel with the weekly Le Sport. Then, with the development of the media and the coverage of Tunisian Ligue Professionnelle 1 matches, this ranking becomes more known.

Top scorers by season

Statistics

All-time top scorers

By club

By country

References 

Tunisian Ligue Professionnelle 1
Football in Tunisia